This is a list of Dutch television related events from 1972.

Events

Debuts

Television shows

1950s
NOS Journaal (1956–present)
Pipo de Clown (1958-1980)

Ending this year

Births
30 September - Winston Post, actor, TV & radio presenter & former model

Deaths